Canyon Ferry Lake is a reservoir on the Missouri River near Helena, Montana and Townsend, Montana.  It is Montana's third largest body of water, covering 35,181 acres (142 km²) and 76 miles (122 km) of shore (1). It was formed by the building of Canyon Ferry Dam, which was completed in 1954 and has been used for electricity, irrigation, and flood controls since.

Recreation
The lake is a popular outdoor destination providing boating, fishing, wildlife habitat, and is nestled against the Big Belt Mountains of the Rocky Mountains.  Canyon Ferry Lake has also become a leading ice boat venue for iceboat racing and iceboat world speed record attempts. The former town of Canton lies beneath the lake, having been submerged following construction of the dam.

Fishing 
The lake is regularly stocked with fish. Canyon Ferry Reservoir continues to be one of the most popular angling destinations in the state of Montana.

See also
List of lakes in Montana
List of dams in the Missouri River watershed

References

External links
Canyon Ferry Lake (Official website), U.S. Bureau of Reclamation (USBR), Department of the Interior
Current Reservoir Data, U.S. Bureau of Reclamation
Canyon Ferry Lake Information, Montana Department of Fish, Wildlife and Parks
Canyon Ferry Recreation Map, U.S. Bureau of Reclamation

Bodies of water of Broadwater County, Montana
Bodies of water of Lewis and Clark County, Montana
Reservoirs in Montana
Buildings and structures in Broadwater County, Montana
Buildings and structures in Lewis and Clark County, Montana
Protected areas of Lewis and Clark County, Montana
Protected areas of Broadwater County, Montana
1954 establishments in Montana